The Institute for Housing and Urban Development Studies (IHS) is an international institute on urban management and housing at the Erasmus University Rotterdam, based in the Netherlands. IHS was founded in 1958 and has more than 60 years of history behind its back. It offers post graduate education (master's degree and PhD) and training, advisory services and applied research in the field of urban management, housing and urban planning.

History 

In 1958 Jan van Ettinger Snr., managing director of the Rotterdam-based Bouwcentrum that had been set up to rebuild Rotterdam after the war, established the first International Course on Building (ICB). The objective was to acquaint planners, engineers and architects from developing countries with systematic methods to meet building requirements. In June 1972 ICB's educational activities were transferred to Bouwcentrum International Education (BIE), which remained located in the round building in the heart of Rotterdam. In addition to the standard course available, more and more specialised courses were added to the teaching programme, aimed at mid-career professionals.

In 1982 the BIE changed its name to the Institute for Housing Studies (IHS). The institute redesigned its courses to promote the development of skills to solve problems in their local context. In 1990 the name changed once more to the Institute for Housing and Urban Development Studies, but the acronym IHS remained. At the same time the institute began linking its short courses to a new Master's programme entitled Urban Management. This programme was a collaboration with the Economic Faculty of the Erasmus University Rotterdam and was later replaced by the present Master's Urban Management and Development (UMD). The Master's programme was re-designed as a one-year Master's degree with six specializations.

During the 90s activities overseas intensified. Longer-term institutional development programmes were fostered. IHS established or strengthened more than a dozen international institutions abroad for training, research, and capacity-building. There was also a significant increase in projects involving multilateral and bilateral organizations, including the World Bank, the Asian Development Bank and the Inter-American Development Bank. Cooperation with UN-HABITAT and its various programmes brought the parties involved especially close.

In January 2000 IHS moved premises to a new building on the Woudestein Campus of the Erasmus University Rotterdam. Its activities were reorganized - as they are today - around research, training and education, and advisory services. Both the Municipality of Rotterdam (through the former Rotterdam Development Corporation) and the Erasmus University Rotterdam became stakeholders. Then in 2004, IHS became an independent limited company as part of the EUR Holding BV. Since June 2010 the director of IHS is Kees van Rooijen.

In 2018 IHS celebrated its 60th year of activity. By this time the institution has built a strong network of partners and over 9000 alumni all over the world contributing to sustainable urban development. This special year was celebrated by organising the "Empowering Cities and Citizens" conference in Rotterdam in November 2018.

Today, IHS develops human and institutional capacities to reduce poverty and improve the standard of living in cities around the world. IHS has over 8,000 alumni in more than 140 countries.

Currently the institution offers a master programme in collaboration with the Erasmus School of Social & Behavioural Sciences called Public Administration: Urban Governance and another master programme in Urban Management & Development with the following 6 Master tracks:

 Strategic Urban Planning & Policy
Urban Housing, Equity & Social Justice
 Urban Environment, Sustainability & Climate Change 
 Infrastructure & Green Cities
Urban Land Governance for Sustainable Development
 Urban Economic Development & Resilience

Education at IHS 
IHS offers a range of post-graduate programmes from post-graduate certificate and diploma programmes to Master's degree programmes. But also short courses, for example on Sustainable Local Economic Development, Urban Management Tools for Climate Change, Green Cities for Eco-efficiency and Sustainable urban Development. The institution also has a 4 year-long PhD programme which fuses urban management with governance. In recent years IHS has offered tailor-made training programmes combining in-country modules and modules in Rotterdam for organisations in South Africa, Cuba, Albania, Brazil, Argentina, Uganda, Indonesia, China, and Yemen. In recent years, IHS organised regional refresher courses addressed to its alumni in South Africa, Thailand, Egypt and Cuba.

Publications 
The IHS publishes three series, the Working Paper Seriesin Urban Management, the IHS Project Papers
Series and the IHS Thesis Series. The IHS Thesis Series was set up in 2006 as a new publication. 
Working Papers are preliminary scientific papers and pre-publication versions of academic articles
and book chapters. The IHS Project Paper Series allows staff involved in advisory projects to publish project outputs.
This series aims to highlight key experiences from projects and innovative methods used on work
executed. With the IHS Thesis Series the objective is to publish the best theses of the Master Programme in
Urban Management and Development (UMD). The abstracts of the theses are also placed on the
IHS website and the full text of the theses are available through the EUR’s Institutional Repository:
RePub (see http://repub.eur.nl).

Achievements 
IHS was selected as the winner for the 2007 UN-Habitat Scroll of Honour Award "for leading the way as a global center of excellence and knowledge through its high quality training programmes in housing, urban management and urban environmental management and planning."

External links
website IHS
website Erasmus University Rotterdam

References

Erasmus University Rotterdam
Urban studies and planning schools